Volleyball at the 2019 Military World Games is held in Wuhan, China from 16 to 26 October 2019.

Medal summary

Results

Indoor volleyball

Beach volleyball

Medal table

References

External links
Indoor Volleyball tournament of the 7th Military World Games - Official website of the 2019 Military World Games
Beach Volleyball tournament of the 7th Military World Games - Official website of the 2019 Military World Games

Volleyball
2019